Women Management is a modeling agency based in New York, Founded by Paul Rowland in 1988,  Women Management has two sister agencies, Supreme Management and Women 360 Management, which are also part of the Women International Agency Chain. Women Management also has offices in Paris, Los Angeles, and Milan.

Overview 
Women is part of Elite World Group network.
Since 2017, the famous talent scout Piero Piazzi is the President Women Milan and Nathalie Cros-Coitton is the managing director of Women Paris.

Models
Models currently represented by Women Management include:
 Naomi Campbell
 Frida Aasen
 Bianca Balti
 Kylie Bax
 Mariacarla Boscono
 Akon Changkou
 Shannan Click
 Jourdan Dunn
 Anna Ewers
 Nyasha Matonhodze
 Isabeli Fontana
 Alexina Graham
 Daphne Groeneveld
 Luma Grothe
 Héloïse Guérin
 Rianne ten Haken
 Laura Harrier
 Camille Hurel
 Mathilde Henning
 Anna Jagodzińska
 Carmen Kass
 Issa Lish
 Rebecca Leigh Longendyke
 Heather Marks
 Hanne Gaby Odiele
 Herieth Paul
 Teddy Quinlivan
 Natasha Poly
 Behati Prinsloo
 Lais Ribeiro
 Eva Riccobono
 Coco Rocha
 Sam Rollinson
 Vlada Roslyakova
 Viktoriya Sasonkina
 Anna Selezneva
 Iselin Steiro
 Julia Stegner
 Daria Strokous
 Iris Strubegger
 Kasia Struss
 Fei Fei Sun
 Lea T
 Nataša Vojnović
 Jing Wen
 Molly Goodwin
 Delaney Quinn

See also
 List of modeling agencies

External links 

 Official web site

References

Companies based in New York (state)
Entertainment companies established in 1988
Modeling agencies